Mount Hayes is the highest mountain in the eastern Alaska Range, in the U.S. state of Alaska. Despite not being a fourteener, it is one of the largest peaks in the United States in terms of rise above local terrain. For example, the Northeast Face rises 8,000 feet (2,440 m) in approximately 2 miles (3.2 km). This large vertical relief contributes to Mount Hayes being the 51st most topographically prominent peak in the world.

The mountain was named in 1898 by W. J. Peters and A. H. Brooks of the U.S. Geological Survey for Charles Willard Hayes (1858–1916), a geologist with the Survey from 1887 through 1911. Mount Hayes was first climbed on August 1, 1941, by Bradford Washburn, Barbara Washburn, Benjamin Ferris, Sterling Hendricks, Henry Hall, and William Shand.

Today's standard climbing route is the East Ridge (Alaska Grade 2+). Mount Hayes is not frequently climbed due to its remoteness and the resulting access difficulties.

Climate

Based on the Köppen climate classification, Mount Hayes is located in a subarctic climate zone with long, cold, snowy winters, and mild summers. Temperatures can drop below −20 °C with wind chill factors below −30 °C. This climate supports glaciers on its slopes including the Hayes Glacier. Precipitation runoff from the mountain drains into tributaries of the Tanana River drainage basin. The months May through June offer the most favorable weather for climbing or viewing.

See also

List of mountain peaks of North America
List of mountain peaks of the United States
List of mountain peaks of Alaska
List of Ultras of the United States

References

Sources
Michael Wood and Colby Coombs, Alaska: A Climbing Guide, The Mountaineers, 2001.

Gallery

External links
"Mount Hayes, Alaska" on Peakbagger
 Weather forecast: Mount Hayes

Alaska Range
Mountains of Alaska
Landforms of Southeast Fairbanks Census Area, Alaska
Mount Hayes
Mountains of Unorganized Borough, Alaska